A referendum on the death penalty for premeditated murder was held in Bermuda on 12 August 1990. The referendum was held following pressure from the British government, and was held as part of the Capital Punishment Referendum Act, 1989. However, voters approved of retaining the penalty, with 79% voting in favour.

The death penalty was later abolished by the Parliament of Bermuda following a vote in December 1999.

Results

References

1990 referendums
Death penalty, 1990
1990 in Bermuda
Capital punishment